Patricia A. Edwards is a retired Australian tennis player. She won the girls' double title in the Australian Championship (now the Australian Open) twice, in 1969 and 1971.

Biography
Edwards' father, tennis coach Vic Edwards, was also Evonne Goolagong's coach. Edwards and Goolagong trained together and were doubles partners in international competitions in 1970 and 1971, including at Wimbledon in 1970.

In 1973 Edwards married Errol Hill at St Mary's Cathedral, Sydney.

References

Australian female tennis players
Australian Open (tennis) junior champions
Grand Slam (tennis) champions in girls' doubles
Living people
Year of birth missing (living people)